Propionyl-CoA carboxylase (PCC) catalyses the carboxylation reaction of propionyl-CoA in the mitochondrial matrix. PCC has been classified both as a ligase and a lyase. The enzyme is biotin-dependent. The product of the reaction is (S)-methylmalonyl CoA. 

 ATP + propionyl-CoA + HCO3− <=> ADP + phosphate + (S)-methylmalonyl-CoA

(S)-Methylmalonyl-CoA cannot be directly utilized by animals. It is acted upon by a racemase, yielding (R)-methylmalonyl-CoA, which is then converted into succinyl-CoA by methylmalonyl-CoA mutase (one of the few metabolic enzymes which requires vitamin B12 as a cofactor). Succinyl-CoA, a Krebs cycle intermediate, is further metabolized into fumarate, then malate, and then oxaloacetate. Oxaloacetate may be transported into the cytosol to form phosphoenol pyruvate and other gluconeogenic intermediates. Propionyl-CoA is therefore an important precursor to glucose.

Propionyl-CoA is the end product of odd-chain fatty acid metabolism, including most methylated fatty acids. The amino acids valine, isoleucine, and methionine are also substrates for propionyl-CoA metabolism.

Structure 

Propionyl-CoA carboxylase (PCC) is a 750 kDa alpha(6)-beta(6)-dodecamer. (Only approximately 540 kDa is native enzyme. ) The alpha subunits are arranged as monomers, decorating the central beta-6 hexameric core. Said core is oriented as a short cylinder with a hole along its axis.
 
The alpha subunit of PCC contains the biotin carboxylase (BC) and biotin carboxyl carrier protein (BCCP) domains. A domain known as the BT domain is also located on the alpha subunit and is essential for interactions with the beta subunit. The 8-stranded anti-parallel beta barrel fold of this domain is particularly interesting. The beta subunit contains the carboxyltransferase (CT) activity.

The BC and CT sites are approximately 55 Å apart, indicative of the entire BCCP domain translocating during catalysis of the carboxylation of propionyl-CoA. This provides clear evidence of crucial dimeric interaction between alpha and beta subunits.

The biotin-binding pocket of PCC is hydrophobic and highly conserved. Biotin and propionyl-CoA bind perpendicular to each other in the oxyanion hole-containing active site. The native enzyme to biotin ratio has been determined to be one mole native enzyme to 4 moles biotin. The N1 of biotin is thought to be the active site base.

Site-directed mutagenesis at D422 shows a change in the substrate specificity of the propionyl-CoA binding site, thus indicating this residue's importance in PCC's catalytic activity. In 1979, inhibition by phenylglyoxal determined that a phosphate group from either propionyl-CoA or ATP reacts with an essential arginine residue in the active site during catalysis. Later (2004), it was suggested that Arginine-338 serves to orient the carboxyphosphate intermediate for optimal carboxylation of biotin.

The KM values for ATP, propionyl-CoA, and bicarbonate has been determined to be 0.08 mM, 0.29 mM, and 3.0 mM, respectively. The isoelectric point falls at pH 5.5. PCC's structural integrity is conserved over the temperature range of -50 to 37 degrees Celsius and the pH range of 6.2 to 8.8. Optimum pH was shown to be between 7.2 and 8.8 without biotin bound. With biotin, optimum pH is 8.0-8.5.

Mechanism 

The normal catalytic reaction mechanism involves a carbanion intermediate and does not proceed through a concerted process. Figure 3 shows a probable pathway.

The reaction has been shown to be slightly reversible at low propionyl-CoA flux.

Subunit genes 
Human propionyl-CoA carboxylase contains two subunits, each encoded by a separate gene:

Pathology 
A deficiency is associated with propionic acidemia.

PCC activity is the most sensitive indicator of biotin status tested to date. In future pregnancy studies, the use of lymphocyte PCC activity data should prove valuable in assessment of biotin status.

Intragenic complementation

When multiple copies of a polypeptide encoded by a gene form an aggregate, this protein structure is referred to as a multimer.  When a multimer is formed from polypeptides produced by two different mutant alleles of a particular gene, the mixed multimer may exhibit greater functional activity than the unmixed multimers formed by each of the mutants alone.  In such a case, the phenomenon is referred to as intragenic complementation.

PCC is a heteropolymer composed of α and β subunits in a α6β6 structure.  Mutations in PCC, either in the α subunit (PCCα) or β subunit (PCCβ) can cause propionic acidemia in humans. When different mutant skin fibroblast cell lines defective in PCCβ were fused in pairwise combinations, the β heteromultimeric protein formed as a result often exhibited a higher level of activity than would be expected based on the activities of the parental enzymes.  This finding of intragenic complementation indicated that the multimeric structure of PCC allows cooperative interactions between the constituent PCCβ monomers that can generate a more functional form of the holoenzyme.

Regulation

Of Propionyl-CoA Carboxylase
a. Carbamazepine (antiepileptic drug): significantly lowers enzyme levels in the liver

b. E. coli chaperonin proteins groES and groEL: essential for folding and assembly of human PCC heteromeric subunits

c. Bicarbonate: negative cooperativity

d. Mg2+ and MgATP2−: allosteric activation

By Propionyl-CoA Carboxylase
a. 6-Deoxyerythronolide B: decrease in PCC levels lead to increased production 

b. Glucokinase in pancreatic beta cells: precursor of beta-PCC shown to decrease KM and increase Vmax; activation

See also 
 Anaplerotic reactions
 Propionic acidemia

References

External links 
 

EC 6.4.1